P. tigris may refer to:
 Panthera tigris, a mammal species
 Phidippus tigris, a spider species in the genus Phidippus
 Pseudolithoxus tigris, a catfish species
 Python tigris, a python species

See also
 Tigris (disambiguation)